Pfeiffers Corner is an unincorporated area located in Howard County in the state of Maryland, United States. The community straddles the border between the census-designated places of Columbia and Ilchester.

The postal community is home to the prominent Pfeiffer family, who owned Troy Hill. The 1895 Pfeiffers Corner Schoolhouse was converted to a private home, then moved to Rockburn Park.

References

Unincorporated communities in Maryland
Unincorporated communities in Howard County, Maryland